
Gmina Nowe Miasto nad Wartą is a rural gmina (administrative district) in Środa Wielkopolska County, Greater Poland Voivodeship, in west-central Poland.

Villages
Gmina Nowe Miasto nad Wartą contains the villages and settlements of Aleksandrów, Boguszyn, Boguszynek, Chocicza, Chromiec, Chwalęcin, Dąbrowa, Dębno, Elżbietów, Hermanów, Jadwigów, Klęka, Kolniczki, Komorze Nowe, Komorze Nowomiejskie, Kruczyn, Kruczynek, Lutynia, Michałów, Nowe Miasto nad Wartą, Radliniec, Rogusko, Skoraczew, Stramnice, Świętomierz, Szypłów, Teresa, Tokarów, Utrata, Wolica Kozia, Wolica Nowa and Wolica Pusta.

Neighbouring gminas
Gmina Nowe Miasto nad Wartą is bordered by the gminas of Jaraczewo, Jarocin, Krzykosy, Książ Wielkopolski, Miłosław and Żerków.

References
Polish official population figures 2006

Nowe Miasto nad Warta
Środa Wielkopolska County